The following outline is provided as an overview of and topical guide to diabetes mellitus (diabetes insipidus not included below):

Diabetes mellitus – group of metabolic diseases in which a person has high blood sugar, either because the pancreas does not produce enough insulin, or because cells do not respond properly to the insulin that is produced, a condition called insulin resistance. The resultant high blood sugar produces the classical symptoms of polyuria (frequent urination), polydipsia (increased thirst) and polyphagia (increased hunger).

What is diabetes mellitus? 
Diabetes can be described as:

 A class of metabolic diseases
 A class of systemic diseases

Types of diabetes mellitus 

 Prediabetes –
 Main types of diabetes:
 Type 1 diabetes – disease that results in autoimmune destruction of insulin-producing beta cells of the pancreas.
 Type 2 diabetes – metabolic disorder that is characterized by high blood glucose in the context of insulin resistance and relative insulin deficiency.
 Disease of affluence – type 2 diabetes is one of the "diseases of affluence", which include mostly chronic non-communicable diseases for which personal lifestyles and societal conditions associated with economic development are believed to be important risk factors.
 Gestational diabetes – Gestational diabetes, is a temporary condition that is first diagnosed during pregnancy. Like type 1 and type 2 diabetes, gestational diabetes causes blood sugar levels to become too high. It involves an increased risk of developing diabetes for both mother and child.
 Other types of diabetes:
 Congenital diabetes –
 Cystic fibrosis-related diabetes –
 Steroid diabetes –
 Monogenic diabetes –

Signs and symptoms of diabetes 

 Symptoms of prediabetes – prediabetes typically has no distinct signs or symptoms. Patients should monitor for signs and symptoms of type 2 diabetes mellitus (see below).

Signs and symptoms of Type II diabetes mellitus 
Symptoms of type II diabetes mellitus include:

 Constant hunger
 Unexplained weight loss
 Weight gain
 Flu-like symptoms, including weakness and fatigue
 Blurred vision
 Slow healing of cuts or bruises 
 Tingling or loss of feeling in hands or feet 
 Recurring gum or skin infections 
 Recurring vaginal or bladder infections
 Acetone odor during diabetic ketoacidosis (DKA)

Causes of diabetes

Causes of diabetes mellitus type 1 

 Genetic causes of diabetes mellitus type 1

Causes of diabetes mellitus type 2 

 Genetic causes of diabetes mellitus type 2
 Lifestyle causes of diabetes mellitus type 2

Related conditions 

 Impaired glucose tolerance –

Preventing diabetes

Preventing diabetes mellitus type 1 
Currently, there is no known way to prevent diabetes mellitus type 1.

Preventing diabetes mellitus type 2 

Preventing diabetes mellitus type 2 – entails a lifestyle with a routine, regime, or self care program that includes the following:
 Maintaining a healthy weight –
 Proper nutrition –
 Regular physical exercise – in addition to helping to maintain a healthy weight, sufficient vigorous physical exercise increases cells' sensitivity to insulin, and can thus prevent and possibly revert insulin resistance.
 Medication – specific medications have been shown to be able to prevent type 2 diabetes. However, the disease can often be delayed through proper nutrition and regular exercise.

Treating diabetes 

Insulin therapy
 Insulin

Low-carbohydrate diet 

 Carbohydrate
 Monosaccharide (simple carbohydrate) –
 Insulin index
 Glycemic index
 Glycemic load

Low-carbohydrate dietary programs 
 Atkins diet
 Atkins Nutritionals
 Robert Atkins (nutritionist)
 William Banting
 Richard K. Bernstein
 Diabetic diet (low-carb)
 CarbSmart ice cream products from Breyers
 Ketogenic diet
 Low-glycemic index diet
 Meatatarian - (all meat diet, generally not recommended by some nutritionists)
 Montignac diet
 No-carbohydrate diet
 Pritikin diet
 Shirataki noodles
 South Beach Living
 Stillman diet
 Sugar Busters!
 Gary Taubes
 Zone diet

History of diabetes 

History of diabetes influence

Persons influential in relation to diabetes 
 Paul Langerhans
 Joseph von Mering
 Oskar Minkowski
 Edward Albert Sharpey-Schafer
 Frederick Banting
 Charles Herbert Best
 James Collip
 Harold Percival Himsworth

See also 
 Outline of health
 Outline of exercise
 Outline of nutrition
 Outline of medicine

References

External links 

 IDF Diabetes Atlas
 National Diabetes Education Program

Diabetes
Diabetes